Knud Lundberg (14 May 1920 – 12 August 2002) was a Danish multi-talented sportsperson, who most notably won a bronze medal with the Denmark national football team at the 1948 Summer Olympics. He represented the Danish national team in football, handball and basketball, and he won the Danish national championship in all three disciplines. He played his footballing career at Akademisk Boldklub.

In his civil life, Lundberg studied medicine and sports. Along with his athletic career, Lundberg worked as a sports journalist, and he was the first sports editor at the Danish newspaper Dagbladet Information, a sports editor at the social democratic newspaper Aktuelt, editor of the annual Fodbold Jul are among his other editorial posts. After ending his sporting career, he, among other things, was a social democratic regional politician and a writer. The number of books written solely by Lundberg or teaming up with other writers adds up to more than 50 with themes ranging from health to sports and fiction. His writings included the four-volume Dansk Fodbold; a chronicle of Danish football from 1939 to 1989, published for the 100th anniversary of the Danish Football Association.

In the last years of his life, Lundberg suffered from Alzheimer's disease.

References

External links
 Danish national football team profile
 Danish national handball team profil
 
 
 

1920 births
2002 deaths
Danish men's footballers
Denmark international footballers
Footballers at the 1948 Summer Olympics
Footballers at the 1952 Summer Olympics
Olympic footballers of Denmark
Olympic bronze medalists for Denmark
Danish male handball players
Danish men's basketball players
Danish male novelists
Olympic medalists in football
20th-century Danish novelists
Medalists at the 1948 Summer Olympics
Association football forwards
20th-century Danish male writers
20th-century Danish journalists
Burials at Hellerup Cemetery